Nico Vanderdonck (born 6 December 1969) is a Belgian football midfielder and later manager.

References

1969 births
Living people
Belgian footballers
K.M.S.K. Deinze players
K.A.A. Gent players
K.S.V. Roeselare players
K.S.K. Ronse players
Belgian Pro League players
Association football midfielders
Belgian football managers
K.S.V. Roeselare managers
K.M.S.K. Deinze managers